Lee Shin-mi (born 15 May 1983) is a South Korean fencer. She competed in the women's individual sabre events at the 2004 and 2008 Summer Olympics.

References

1983 births
Living people
South Korean female fencers
Olympic fencers of South Korea
Fencers at the 2004 Summer Olympics
Fencers at the 2008 Summer Olympics
Asian Games medalists in fencing
Fencers at the 2002 Asian Games
Fencers at the 2006 Asian Games
Asian Games gold medalists for South Korea
Asian Games silver medalists for South Korea
Medalists at the 2002 Asian Games
Medalists at the 2006 Asian Games
Universiade medalists in fencing
Universiade gold medalists for South Korea
21st-century South Korean women